Aldona Džiugaitė-Aleškevičienė-Statulevičienė (1 January 1936 – 24 February 2017) was a Lithuanian mathematician who specialized in probability theory.

Biography 
She graduated from Vilnius University as a Doctor of Physics and Mathematics in 1964 and  worked at the Institute of Mathematics and Informatics until 2010. 
She gained a second PhD from the Academy of Sciences of Uzbekistan.
She died in 2017 in Vilnius.

Scientific activity  
Her most important work is on the limit theorems of probability theory, proven integral theorems of local and integral boundary theorems for Markov chains, large deviations of the sum of the sum of random sums, and the sum of random vector amounts. She had determined the random distribution of local time limit distributions and convergence rate estimates.

She was the chief researcher at the institute of mathematics and informatics at the Lithuanian Academy of Sciences from 1989 to 2010.

Awards
 1987 Lithuanian State Prize

References

1936 births
2017 deaths
20th-century Lithuanian mathematicians
Women mathematicians
Probability theorists
Vilnius University alumni
21st-century Lithuanian mathematicians